The Combs–Hehl Bridge is a twin span single pier cantilever bridge carrying Interstate 275 (I-275) across the Ohio River. It connects the Eastern portion of Cincinnati, Ohio (near the Coney Island amusement park) and Campbell County, Kentucky.

The bridge is named for former governor of Kentucky Bert T. Combs and former Campbell County Judge Executive Lambert Hehl but is commonly referred to by locals as the Coney Bridge since Coney Island amusement park is located at the Eastern end of the bridge, just after the bridge crosses into Ohio.

Normal traffic makes it faster for commuters from Cincinnati's eastern suburbs to travel from Ohio to Kentucky on the Combs-Hehl bridge, travel less than 2 miles on I-275, and then take I-471 North into downtown.

See also
 
 
 
 
 List of crossings of the Ohio River

External links
 http://www.cincinnati-transit.net/combs-hehl.html  for description and more photos

References

Road bridges in Ohio
Bridges in Cincinnati
Bridges over the Ohio River
Bridges completed in 1979
Road bridges in Kentucky
Interstate 75
Bridges on the Interstate Highway System
Cantilever bridges in the United States
Transportation buildings and structures in Cincinnati
Buildings and structures in Campbell County, Kentucky
Transportation in Campbell County, Kentucky